Pavel Anatolyevich Shadrin (born 14 January 1993) is a Russian football midfielder. He plays for FC Tyumen.

Club career
He made his debut in the Russian Second Division for FC Rubin-2 Kazan on 25 April 2011 in a game against FC Zenit-Izhevsk

He made his Russian Football National League debut for FC Neftekhimik Nizhnekamsk on 7 July 2019 in a game against FC Mordovia Saransk.

Honours
 Russian Professional Football League Zone Ural-Povolzhye Best Player: 2016–17.

References

1993 births
Living people
Russian footballers
Association football midfielders
FC Rubin Kazan players
FC Neftekhimik Nizhnekamsk players
FC Zenit-Izhevsk players
FC Tyumen players
Russian First League players
Russian Second League players